Mushegh Mamikonian or Mušeł Mamikonian can refer to one of the following members of the noble Armenian Mamikonian family:
 
 Mushegh I Mamikonian, sparapet and regent of Arsacid Armenia in the 370s
 Mushegh II Mamikonian, marzban of Persian Armenia in 591
 Mushegh III Mamikonian, killed fighting alongside the Persians at the Battle of Qadisiyya in 636
 Mushegh IV Mamikonian, sparapet of Armenia in the 650s
 Mushegh V Mamikonian, sparapet of Armenia in 706–709
 Mushegh VI Mamikonian, ishkhan of Armenia in 748–753, killed at the Battle of Bagrevand in 775